Hiddleston is a surname. Notable people with the surname include:

Hugh Hiddleston (1855–1934), Australian cricketer
Patricia Hiddleston (1933–2017), Scottish mathematician
Syd Hiddleston (1890–1940), New Zealand cricketer
Tom Hiddleston (born 1981), English actor